Fred Williams may refer to:

Sports

American football
 Fred Williams (American football coach) (1878–1962), American football coach for Emporia State University
 Fred Williams (defensive lineman) (1929–2000), American football player
 Fred Williams (wide receiver) (born 1988), American football player

Association football (soccer)
 Fred Williams (footballer, born 1873) (1873–?), English footballer with Manchester City and Manchester United
Fred Williams (Canadian soccer) (1896–1929), Canadian soccer player 
 Fred Williams (footballer, born 1918) (1918–1994), English footballer with Southampton and Stockport County

Other sports
 Fred Williams (Australian footballer, born 1900) (1900–1975), Australian rules football player
 Fred Williams (Australian footballer, born 1919) (1919–2007), Australian rules football player 
 Fred Williams (baseball) (fl. 1920s), American baseball player
 Fred Williams (basketball, born 1896) (1896–1937), American college basketball player
 Fred Williams (basketball, born 1957), American basketball coach
 Fred Williams (ice hockey) (born 1956), Canadian ice hockey player
 Freddie Williams (speedway rider) (1926–2013), Welsh motorcycle speedway rider

Others
 Fred Williams (mayor) (1854–1940), mayor of Napier, New Zealand, 1902–1904
 Fred Williams (journalist) (1863–1944), Canadian newspaper editor, writer, and historian
 Fred Williams (artist) (1927–1982), Australian painter
 Fred Williams (actor) (born 1938), German actor

See also
 Freddie Williams (disambiguation)
 Frederick Williams (disambiguation)
 Fred Williamson (born 1938), American actor and former American football player